"Those Days" is the fourth track from Shaggy's album, Intoxication (2007).

Charts

Shaggy (musician) songs
2007 singles
2007 songs
Songs written by Shaggy (musician)